The 1944 Jordanian  League (known as The Jordanian  League, was the first season of Jordan League. The Jordan Premier League first kicked off  with Al-Faisaly Club winning the inaugural event held under the patronage of King Abdullah I. Four teams competed in the league : Al-Ahli, Jordan Club, Homentmen and Al-Faisaly.

Teams

Map

External links
 Jordan Football Association website

Jordanian Pro League seasons
1943–44 in Asian association football leagues
1944–45 in Asian association football leagues
1944 in Transjordan